Cyclochila virens, commonly known as the northern greengrocer, is a species of cicada native to northeastern Queensland.

References

Hemiptera of Australia
Insects described in 1906
Cicadinae